The 2013 NCAA Division II men's soccer championship featured 35 schools in four unbalanced Super-Regional tournaments involving seven to ten teams each. Super-Regional games were played at campus sites.

The Division II College Cup was held at Blanchard Woods Park in Evans, Georgia, and was hosted by the Peach Belt Conference.

In the national semifinals, Rockhurst (17-3-3) was defeated by Southern New Hampshire 2–1, and Simon Fraser (17-2-2) fell to Carson-Newman 3–2. Southern New Hampshire (21-1-1) won its second Division II crown by beating Carson-Newman (16-5-1) 2–1 in the national final.

East Super-Regional
Source:

Midwest Super-Regional
Source:

South Super-Regional
Source:

West Super-Regional
Source:

Division II College Cup at Evans, Ga.
Source:

Attendance: Semi #1 = N/A; Semi #2 = N/A; Final = 1200

Final

References

External links 
NCAA Men's Division II Soccer

NCAA Division II Men's Soccer Championship
NCAA Division II Men's Soccer Championship
NCAA Division II Men's Soccer Championship
Soccer in Georgia (U.S. state)
NCAA Division II Men's Soccer Championship
NCAA Division II Men's Soccer Championship